Amit Chaudhuri (born 15 May 1962) is a novelist, poet, essayist, literary critic, editor, singer, and music composer from India.

He was Professor of Contemporary Literature at the University of East Anglia from 2006 to 2021, Since 2020, he has been at Ashoka University, India as Professor of Creative Writing and is also since 2021, Director of the Centre for the Creative and the Critical, Ashoka University.

Life
Amit Chaudhuri was born in Calcutta (renamed Kolkata) in 1962 and grew up in Bombay (renamed Mumbai). His father was the first Indian CEO of Britannia Industries Limited. His mother, Bijoya Chaudhuri, was a highly acclaimed singer of Rabindra Sangeet, Nazrulgeeti, Atul Prasad and Hindi bhajans. He was a student at the Cathedral and John Connon School, Bombay. He took his first degree in English literature from University College London, and wrote his doctoral dissertation on D. H. Lawrence's poetry at Balliol College, Oxford.

He is married to Rosinka Chaudhuri, Professor of Cultural Studies and Director of the Centre for Studies in Social Sciences, Calcutta (CSSSC).  They have one daughter.

Chaudhuri began writing a series for The Paris Review titled The Moment from January 2018. He also wrote an occasional column, 'Telling Tales', for The Telegraph.

Fiction, non-fiction, poetry 
Fiction

A Strange and Sublime Address, Chaudhuri’s first novel, published in 1991, was republished by Penguin Random House India in 2016 as a 25th anniversary edition, with a foreword by Colm Toibin.

Afternoon Raag,  his second novel, interleaves experiences of Oxford with memories of Bombay. It was published in 1993 and won the Encore Award. The 25th anniversary edition was published by Penguin Random House India in 2019 with a foreword by James Wood.

Freedom Song, his third novel, was published four years later. Set against the background of the post-Babri Masjid demolition, it is a record of both the artificial quiet that such a socio-political situation creates as well as the evocation of a Calcutta winter where everyday life must go on. Published in America with the first two novels, in 2000 it won the Los Angeles Times Book Prize.

A New World (2001), Chaudhuri’s fourth novel, tells the story of Jayojit Chatterjee, who returns after a divorce with his seven-year-old son Vikram (“Bonny”) to Calcutta to visit his aging parents. It won the Sahitya Akademi Award.

Real Time, Chaudhuri’s collection of short fiction, was published in 2002. The title story, ‘Real Time’ is prescribed reading for English in the GCSE syllabus in the UK.

The Immortals, his fifth novel, published in 2009, follows Nirmalya and his music teacher, Shyamji, as they learn and practice Indian classical music in a changing world.

Odysseus Abroad, Chaudhuri’s sixth novel, appeared in 2014-15. It unfolds over the course of a single day, in July in 1985 London, following the student protagonist, Ananda.

Friend of My Youth is Chaudhuri's seventh novel. It was published in the UK and India in 2017 and in the US in 2019. It is an account of a narrator and novelist called Amit Chaudhuri who visits Bombay, a city where he grew up, for a book event.

Sojourn, Chaudhuri's eighth novel, was published in 2022. Here, an unnamed man arrives in Berlin as a visiting professor. His growing absorption in his surrounding is accompanied by a loosening of his grasp on memory.

Non-fiction

Chaudhuri’s D.Phil. dissertation at Oxford was published by Clarendon Press as a monograph titled D.H. Lawrence and Difference in 2003. It was called a ‘classic’ by Tom Paulin in his preface to the book, and a ‘path-breaking work’ by Terry Eagleton in the London Review of Books.

Chaudhuri edited the influential anthology The Picador Book of Modern Indian Literature in 2001.

He also edited Memory’s Gold: Writings on Calcutta (2008)

His first major work of non-fiction, Calcutta: Two Years in the City, was published in 2013 as was Telling Tales, his second book of essays.

On Tagore, a collection of Chaudhuri’s essays on Rabindranath Tagore, was awarded the Rabindra Puraskar in 2012.

Origins of Dislike, a third collection of essays, was published in 2019.

Literary Activism, a collection of essays by a variety of participants at the first symposium of the same name (see below), was published in 2017 by Boiler House Press in the UK, and by OUP in India and the US.

Finding the Raga, an exploration of Hindustani classical music, was published by Faber in the UK, NYRB Books in the US and Penguin in India in 2021.

Poetry

St. Cyril Road and Other Poems, Chaudhuri’s first collection of poems, was published in 2005 by Penguin in India.

Sweet Shop, his second book of poems, appeared from Penguin Random House India in 2018, and from Salt (UK) in 2019.

Ramanujan, his third collection of poems, was published by Shearsman Books in the UK  in 2021.

Critical responses 
James Wood, writing about Chaudhuri in The New Yorker, said, "He has beautifully practiced that 'refutation of the spectacular' throughout his career, both as a novelist and as a critic. ... how little Chaudhuri forces anything on us — there is no obvious plot, no determined design, no faked 'conflict' or other drama ... The effect is closer to documentary than to fiction; gentle artifice — selection, pacing, occasional dialogue — hides overt artifice. The author seems to say, Here he is; what do you think? The literary pleasure is a human pleasure, as we slowly encounter this strolling, musing, forceful self."

Afternoon Raag: ‘It is a meditation, a felicitous prose poem.’ Karl Miller, The Independent. 

A New World: ‘The condition of a stranger in a familiar land is dramatized with beguiling simplicity and tact in this deeply moving fourth novel…. A pitch-perfect analysis of repressed and stunted emotion, and another triumph to set beside those of Desai, Rushdie, Roy, and especially (the Chekhovian master Chaudhuri most closely resembles) R.K. Narayan.’ Kirkus Reviews The Immortals: ‘Amit Chaudhuri, himself a composer and musician, excels in the passages devoted to music, "the miracle of song and its pleasure". Steven Poole, The Guardian. Odysseus Abroad: ‘Chaudhuri is a singular writer. He defies form; instead he has perfected an observational fiction based on insight and memory.’ Eileen Battersby, Irish Times Telling Tales: ‘Chaudhuri’s intellectual project is not so much to cross academic boundaries as to remove the sign that says: “No playing on the grass”. Like Barthes (and Lacan), he sees merit in concentrating less on the meaningful and more on the apparently meaningless.' Deborah Levy in the New Statesman Friend of My Youth: 'With the publication of Friend of My Youth, Amit Chaudhuri is now the author of seven novels, greatly admired, especially by his peers... The drama of the self, spun from Chaudhuri's meditations and recollections, is artfully composed and utterly absorbing.' Kate Webb in the Times Literary Supplement.

Sojourn: 'Chaudhuri is one of the most consistently interesting writers working today. You get the feeling that with each book he has to begin again to reconfigure from the ground up what he wants the novel to be and to do. It's this radical questioning that makes him such a consistently engaging writer, and what makes this novel so memorable.'

Activism 

Literary activism

In response to the marginalisation of the literary by both the market (that is, mainstream publishing houses) and by academia, Chaudhuri began, in December 2014, a series of annual symposiums on what he called 'literary activism', thereby attempting to create a space akin neither ‘to the literary festival or the academic conference’, bringing together writers, academics, and artists each year. One of the features of Chaudhuri’s initiative has been a resistance to specialisation, or what he calls 'professionalisation'. The project has involved the fashioning of a new terminology by Chaudhuri, in which he creates terms like 'market activism', and assigns very particular means to terms like 'literary activism' and 'deprofessionalisation’. Some of his positions are contained in his mission statement, and in his n+1 essay. 'So there may well be in literary activism a strangeness that echoes the strangeness of the literary. Unlike market activism, whose effect on us depends on a certain randomness which reflects the randomness of the free market, literary activism may be desultory, in that its aims and value aren’t immediately explicable.'

A collection of essays titled Literary Activism: A Symposium from the first symposium was published in 2017 by Boiler House Press in the UK, and by OUP in India and the US. A new website for literary activism, www.literaryactivism.com, edited by Chaudhuri, came into existence on 4 August 2020.

Architectural activism

In 2015, Chaudhuri began drawing attention to Calcutta’s architectural legacy and campaigning for its conservation. Writing about these houses made in the twentieth century, he lists their characteristics:

Music
Chaudhuri is a singer in the North Indian classical tradition, who has performed internationally. He learned singing from his mother, Bijoya Chaudhuri, and from the late Pandit Govind Prasad Jaipurwale of the Kunwar Shyam gharana. HMV India (now Saregama) has released two recordings of his singing, and a selection of the khayals he has performed on CD. Bihaan Music brought out a collection called The Art of the Khayal in 2016. A selection of classical recordings:

 'Puriya Kalyan khayal'
 'Jog Bahar khayal and tarana'
 'E parabase rabe ke' (Rabindra Sangeet)
 'Chandrasakhi bhajan'

In 2004, he began to conceptualise a project in experimental music, This is Not Fusion, released in Britain on the independent jazz label, Babel Label. His second CD, Found Music, came out in October 2010 in the UK from Babel and was released in India from EMI. It was an allaboutjazz.com Editor’s Choice of 2010. Songs from This is Not Fusion include 'Berlin' and 'The Layla Riff to Todi'. His version of 'Summertime', incorporating the notes of raga Malkauns, was featured in BBC 4's documentary, Gershwin's Summertime: the Song that Conquered the World.

In 2015, Chauhuri was invited to write the libretto for the opera composed by Ravi Shankar, Sukanya. It had its world premiere at the Royal Festival Hall, London, in 2017.

In 2022, he created a new raga as part of a project that sees the raga as experiment and based on his feeling 'that the raga in North Indian classical music is primarily a reshaping of what Marcel Duchamp called "found material". That is, tunes and melodies aren't set to ragas; instead, ragas are a slowing down of, and minute investigation into, particular tunes and melodies, with their characteristic clusters of notes and progressions.' Basing it on the Western song, 'O Sole Mio', he calls the composition 'Khayal: O Sole Mio'. He performed it for the first time at Holywell Music Room, Oxford, in July 2022.

As part of this ongoing experimental exploration, he created, in the year of Raj Rammohun Roy's 250th birth anniversary, a raga called Rammohan, combining ragas Mohankauns and Ramkeli to do so. He performed a short version of this at Smith College, Massachusetts, on 17th September 2022, and the complete version, including slow and fast khayal compositions, in Calcutta on 5th December 2022.

Awards and honours
1991 Betty Trask Award and Commonwealth Writers' Prize for Best First Book for A Strange and Sublime Address
1994 Encore Award and Southern Arts Literature Prize, Afternoon Raag
1999 Los Angeles Times Book Prize, Freedom Song
2002 Sahitya Akademi Award, A New World
2012 Rabindra Puraskar, On Tagore
2012 Infosys Prize for the Humanities in Literary Studies
He was elected Fellow of the Royal Society of Literature in 2009.

Awards for his fiction include the Commonwealth Writers Prize, the Betty Trask Prize, the Encore Prize, the Los Angeles Times Book Prize for Fiction, and the Indian government's Sahitya Akademi Award. Finding the Raga (2021) won the James Tait Black Prize at Edinburgh in August 2022. Dr. Simon Cooke, one of the judges in the Biography category, called Finding the Raga “a work of great depth, subtlety, and resonance, which unobtrusively changed the way we thought about music, place, and creativity. Folding the ethos of the raga into its own form, it is a beautifully voiced, quietly subversive masterpiece in the art of listening to the world.” He received the Rabindra Puraskar from the Government of West Bengal for his book On Tagore. He was also given the Sangeet Samman by the Government of West Bengal for his contribution to Hindustani classical music. He is an honorary fellow of Balliol College, Oxford.

In 2022, he was awarded the James Tait Memorial Prize for his book Finding the Raga: An Improvisation on Indian Music.

In September 2020, he was elected as an Honorary Fellow of the Modern Language Association (MLA).

In 2013, Chaudhuri became the first person to be awarded the Infosys Prize for outstanding contribution to the humanities in Literary Studies, by a jury comprising Amartya Sen, Akeel Bilgrami (Columbia University), Homi Bhabha (Harvard), Sheldon Pollock (Columbia), former Indian chief justice Leila Seth, and legal thinker Upendra Baxi (Warwick). In his prize-giving address, Amartya Sen said: 'He [Chaudhuri] is of course a remarkable intellectual with a great record for literary writing showing a level of sensibility as well as a kind of quiet humanity which is quite rare. It really is quite extraordinary that someone could have had that kind of range that Amit Chaudhuri has in terms of his work and it could be so consistently of the highest quality.'

Bibliography

Novels
Afternoon Raag. Heinemann, 1993, 
Freedom Song. Picador, 1998; Alfred A. Knopf, 1999,  excerpt
; Random House Digital, Inc., 2002, 

A strange and sublime address. Penguin, 2012, 

 Friend of My Youth, 2017, Penguin Random House India

Collected short stories

Poetry

Libretto
 Sukanya, the only opera by Ravi Shankar

Non-fiction

Small Orange Flags (Seagull, 2003) 

 Calcutta: Two Years in the City, Union Books (2013)

Edited Anthologies

Memory's Gold: Writings on Calcutta (2008)

Critical studies and reviews
 Review of Odysseus Abroad.

Reprints

Newspaper articles

See also
 List of Indian writers

References

External links

Amit Chaudhuri at Twitter

Amit Chaudhuri at the Munzinger-Archiv
Amit Chaudhuri at the Los Angeles Review of Books
‘Surpanakha’ story at The Little Magazine
"An unlikely radical", The Hindu
A date with Amit Chaudhuri, The Telegraph

1962 births
Bengali writers
Bengali Hindus
Writers from Kolkata
Alumni of University College London
Alumni of Balliol College, Oxford
English-language writers from India
Indian male novelists
Indian male essayists
Recipients of the Sahitya Akademi Award in English
Academics of the University of East Anglia
Living people
Fellows of the Royal Society of Literature
Chauduri, Amit
Indian emigrants to England
20th-century Indian novelists
20th-century Indian essayists
20th-century Indian male writers
Writers from Mumbai